Distoleon is a genus of antlions in the subfamily Myrmeleontinae.

Species
 Distoleon annulatus (Klug, 1834) 
 Distoleon bistrigatus (Rambur, 1842) 
 Distoleon canariensis (Tjeder, 1939) 
 Distoleon catta (Fabricius, 1775) 
 Distoleon nefarius Navás, 1910 
 Distoleon pulverulentus (Rambur, 1842)
 Distoleon somnolentus (Gerstaecker, 1885) 
 Distoleon tetragrammicus (Fabricius, 1798)

References

Myrmeleontinae
Myrmeleontidae genera